The 1997 European Open was the 1997 edition of the European Open snooker tournament, held from 23 February to 2 March 1997 at the Mediterranean Conference Centre, Valletta, Malta. John Higgins defeated John Parrott by nine frames to five (9–5) in the final to claim his sixth ranking-event title. In the semi-finals Higgins defeated James Wattana and Parrott beat Ken Doherty. The tournament was the seventh of ten WPBSA ranking events in the 1996/1997 season, following the International Open and preceding the Thailand Open.

Tournament summary
The 1997 tournament was the seventh of tenth WPBSA ranking events in the 1996/1997 season, following the International Open and preceding the Thailand Open. Held in February, the International Open was won by Stephen Hendry, who defeated Tony Drago by nine frames to one (9–1) in the final.

Final
In the best-of-17 final Higgins defeated Parrott 9–5 to win his sixth ranking title, earning £60,000 in prize money.

Main draw

Final

References

External links

European Masters (snooker)
European Open
European Open (snooker)
European Open
European Open
Snooker in Malta